David Witt (born June 2, 1973) is an American former professional tennis player best known as the former long-time coach of Venus Williams. He is currently coaching Jessica Pegula. He enjoyed a successful junior career, during which time he won the USTA Boys' 16s Clay, Hard and National Championships and was the top-ranked under-16 in the USTA in 1989. He was also a semi-finalist at the US Open Junior Boys Singles event in 1991.

His career on the main tour proved less fruitful, failing to break into the top 100 and winning no titles; the closest he came was in the U.S. Men's Clay Court Championships in Birmingham, Alabama, where he and Brian MacPhie were runners-up in the doubles in 1994. He did win two challenger-level events in his career: Guadalajara, Mexico in 1992 and the Levene Gouldin & Thompson Tennis Challenger at Binghamton, New York in 1997. He retired from professional tennis in 2005.

In 2002, while working as the resident pro at the Deerwood Country Club in Jacksonville, Florida, Witt was approached by the Williams sisters to act as a hitting partner during their participation at the Bausch & Lomb Championships at nearby Amelia Island. In 2007, they asked him to accompany them to Charleston, South Carolina for the Family Circle Cup. Since then he has acted as a travelling hitting partner for both women, most notably for elder sister Venus. In December 2018, Venus ended the 11-year partnership. Since July 2019, David Witt is coaching Jessica Pegula.

ATP career finals

Doubles: 1 (runner-up)

ATP Challenger and ITF Futures finals

Singles: 4 (2–2)

Doubles: 4 (2–2)

Performance timelines

Singles

Doubles

References

External links
 
 

1973 births
Living people
American male tennis players
Sportspeople from High Point, North Carolina
Sportspeople from Jacksonville, Florida
People from Ponte Vedra Beach, Florida
Tennis people from Florida
Tennis people from North Carolina